is a Japanese professional sumo wrestler from Kashiwa, Chiba. He made his debut in November 2017 and reached the top makuuchi division in May 2020. He wrestles for Sadogatake stable. His highest rank has been maegashira 3. He was runner-up in the January 2023 tournament, also winning the Fighting Spirit prize.

Career
He began sumo in the first grade of elementary school, and won the national junior high school championship in his third year of junior high. He went to Saitama Sakae High School, famous for its sumo program, and was classmates with Naya and Tsukahara. After graduating from high school he joined Sadogatake stable, recruited by ex-sekiwake Kotonowaka, to whom he had a connection as Kotonowaka's eldest son was a fellow member of Kashiwa City's boys sumo club. In his first tournament on the banzuke in January 2018 he took part in a playoff with Tsukahara for the jonokuchi division championship after both finished with a 6–1 record. He reached the makushita division in September 2018 and although he was unable to secure a winning record he returned to makushita in January 2019 and five straight winning records saw him reach elite sekitori status after the September 2019 tournament. To mark the occasion he changed his shikona to Kotoshōhō Yoshinari. 

Kotoshōhō won the jūryō division yūshō or championship with a 12–3 record in March 2020, only his third tournament in the division, and this earned him promotion to the top division for the Natsu tournament scheduled for May 2020. He has been praised by commentators for his calm demeanour and his maturity in the dohyō despite being only 20 years of age at the time of his promotion. Three further winning records brought him to the joi-jin rank of maegashira 3 for the January 2021 tournament, where he managed only two wins facing top-ranked opposition. He missed several days of the March 2021 tournament due to injury, only managing to record one win, and he was demoted back to jūryō for the May 2021 tournament. He won his second jūryō division championship in January 2022 with an 11–4 record, and returned to the top division for the March 2022 tournament.
 He secured a winning record of 9–6 there, but then had losing records in the next four tournaments. From the rank of maegashira 13 in January 2023, he entered the final day level with ōzeki Takakeishō on 11–3, and fought him for the championship in the final match of the tournament, the first maegashira to be in such a position since 15-day tournaments were established in 1949. Although he was defeated and missed out on the Outstanding Performance award, he did receive the Fighting Spirit award for his 11–4 performance, the best of his career.

Fighting style
According to his Japan Sumo Association profile, Kotoshoho prefers a migi-yotsu (left hand outside, right hand inside grip on his opponent’s mawashi and his most common winning kimarite are yori-kiri (force out) and oshi dashi (push out).

Career record

See also
List of active sumo wrestlers
List of sumo tournament top division runners-up
List of sumo second division tournament champions
Glossary of sumo terms

References

External links
 

1999 births
Living people
Japanese sumo wrestlers
Sumo people from Chiba Prefecture
Sadogatake stable sumo wrestlers